The Haunted is the debut studio album by Swedish metal band The Haunted, released in 1998 on Earache Records.  Tracks 1–4 and 12 were part of the band's greatest hits album, Warning Shots. Peter Dolving and Adrian Erlandsson both quit at different times after the album, but both returned on different releases, with Dolving on rEVOLVEr, and Erlandsson on Eye of the Storm.

Track listing

Personnel 
'''The Haunted
 Peter Dolving ― vocals
 Anders Björler ― lead guitar
 Patrik Jensen ― rhythm guitar
 Jonas Björler ― bass
 Adrian Erlandsson ― drums

References 

1998 debut albums
The Haunted (Swedish band) albums
Earache Records albums
Albums produced by Fredrik Nordström
Albums recorded at Studio Fredman